The List of Wildlife Species at Risk currently has more than 800 entries for Canadian wild life species considered vulnerable; including 363 classified as endangered species, —190 threatened species, —235 special concern, and 22 extirpated (no longer found in the wild). About 65 percent of Canada’s resident species are considered "Secure". More than 30 wildlife species have become extinct in the wild since the arrival of European settlers.

The Government of Canada maintains a list of all plant and animal species, or designatable units (DUs) thereof, federally recognized as special concern, threatened, endangered, extirpated, and extinct in Canada under Schedule I of the Species at Risk Act (SARA).

SARA Schedule
Species listed on SARA Schedule I receive federal legal protections under the Act, including the protection of individuals, populations, and their habitat from harm. Listing on Schedule I of the act also mandates the formation of a species recovery team and strategy. The addition of species or DUs to Schedule I is done annually by the Minister of the Environment, based on formal assessment recommendations by the Committee on the Status of Endangered Wildlife in Canada (COSEWIC), an independent committee of wildlife experts and scientists. COSEWIC assessments and IUCN designations by themselves are not to be confused with actual Schedule I listings as both of the former have no formal legal status in Canada.

Mammals

Extirpated mammals

 Eschrichtius robustus (Atlantic population) — grey whale
 Mustela nigripes — black-footed ferret
 Odobenus rosmarus rosmarus (Northwest Atlantic population) — Atlantic walrus

Endangered mammals
 Balaenoptera borealis (Pacific population) — sei whale
 Balaenoptera musculus (Atlantic population) — blue whale
 Balaenoptera musculus (Pacific population) — blue whale
 Dipodomys ordii — Ord's kangaroo rat
 Eubalaena glacialis — North Atlantic right whale
 Eubalaena japonica — North Pacific right whale
 Gulo gulo (eastern population) — wolverine
 Hyperoodon ampullatus (Scotian Shelf population) — northern bottlenose whale
 Marmota vancouverensis — Vancouver Island marmot
 Martes americana atrata (Newfoundland population) — American marten
 Orcinus orca (Northeast Pacific southern resident population) — killer whale
 Rangifer tarandus caribou (Atlantic–Gaspésie population) — woodland caribou
 Scapanus townsendii — Townsend's mole
 Sorex bendirii — Pacific water shrew
 Taxidea taxus jacksoni — American badger, jacksoni subspecies
 Taxidea taxus jeffersonii — American badger, jeffersonii subspecies
 Vulpes velox — swift fox

Threatened mammals

 Antrozous pallidus — pallid bat
 Balaenoptera physalus (Pacific population) — fin whale
 Bison bison athabascae — wood bison
 Enhydra lutris — sea otter
 Delphinapterus leucas (St. Lawrence Estuary population) — beluga whale
 Mustela haidarum — Haida ermine
 Megaptera novaeangliae (North Pacific population) — humpback whale
 Orcinus orca (Northeast Pacific transient population) — killer whale
 Orcinus orca (Northeast Pacific northern resident population) — killer whale
 Rangifer tarandus caribou (boreal population) — woodland caribou
 Rangifer tarandus caribou (southern mountain population) — woodland caribou
 Urocyon cinereoargenteus — grey fox

Mammals of special concern

 Balaena mysticetus (Bering–Chukchi–Beaufort population) — bowhead whale
 Balaenoptera physalus (Atlantic population) — fin whale
 Canis lycaon — eastern wolf
 Enhydra lutris — sea otter
 Cynomys ludovicianus — black-tailed prairie dog
 Eschrichtius robustus (eastern North Pacific population) — grey whale
 Euderma maculatum — spotted bat
 Eumetopias jubatus — Steller sea lion
 Microtus pinetorum — woodland vole
 Orcinus orca (Northeast Pacific offshore population) — killer whale
 Phocoena phocoena (Pacific Ocean population) — harbour porpoise
 Rangifer tarandus caribou (northern mountain population) — woodland caribou
 Scalopus aquaticus — eastern mole
 Sylvilagus nuttallii nuttallii — Nuttall's cottontail, nuttallii subspecies
 Ursus maritimus — polar bear

Birds

Extirpated birds
Tympanuchus cupido — greater prairie-chicken

Endangered birds

 Ammodramus henslowii — Henslow's sparrow
 Athene cunicularia — burrowing owl
 Centrocercus urophasianus urophasianus — greater sage-grouse, urophasianus subspecies
 Charadrius melodus circumcinctus — piping plover, circumcinctus subspecies
 Charadrius melodus melodus — piping plover, melodus subspecies
 Charadrius montanus — mountain plover
 Colinus virginianus — northern bobwhite
 Dendroica kirtlandii — Kirtland's warbler
 Empidonax virescens — Acadian flycatcher
 Eremophila alpestris strigata — horned lark, strigata subspecies
 Grus americana — whooping crane
 Icteria virens auricollis (British Columbia population) — yellow-breasted chat, auricollis subspecies
 Lanius ludovicianus migrans — loggerhead shrike, migrans subspecies
 Loxia curvirostra percna — red crossbill, percna subspecies
 Megascops kennicottii macfarlanei — western screech-owl, macfarlanei subspecies
 Numenius borealis — Eskimo curlew
 Oreoscoptes montanus — sage thrasher
 Picoides albolarvatus — white-headed woodpecker
 Pooecetes gramineus affinis — vesper sparrow, affinis subspecies
 Protonotaria citrea — prothonotary warbler
 Rallus elegans — king rail
 Sphyrapicus thyroideus — Williamson's sapsucker
 Sterna dougallii — roseate tern
 Strix occidentalis caurina — spotted owl, caurina subspecies
 Tyto alba (eastern population) — barn owl

Threatened birds

 Accipiter gentilis laingi — northern goshawk, laingi subspecies
 Aegolius acadicus brooksi — northern saw-whet owl, brooksi subspecies
 Anthus spragueii — Sprague's pipit
 Brachyramphus marmoratus — marbled murrelet
 Falco peregrinus anatum — peregrine falcon, anatum subspecies
 Ixobrychus exilis — least bittern
 Lanius ludovicianus excubitorides — loggerhead shrike, excubitorides subspecies
 Phoebastria albatrus — short-tailed albatross
 Puffinus creatopus — pink-footed shearwater
Riparia riparia - Bank Swallow
 Rhodostethia rosea — Ross' gull
 Vermivora chrysoptera — golden-winged warbler
 Wilsonia citrina — hooded warbler

Birds of special concern

 Bucephala islandica (eastern population) — Barrow's goldeneye
 Coturnicops noveboracensis — yellow rail
 Dendroica cerulea — cerulean warbler
 Falco peregrinus pealei — peregrine falcon, pealei subspecies
 Histrionicus histrionicus (eastern population) — harlequin duck
 Icteria virens virens — yellow-breasted chat, virens subspecies
 Megascops kennicottii kennicottii — western screech-owl, kennicottii subspecies
 Melanerpes lewis — Lewis' woodpecker
 Numenius americanus — long-billed curlew
 Otus flammeolus — flammulated owl
 Pagophila eburnea — ivory gull
 Passerculus sandwichensis princeps — Savannah sparrow, princeps subspecies
 Rhynchophanes mccownii — thick-billed longspur
 Seiurus motacilla — Louisiana waterthrush
 Synthliboramphus antiquus — ancient murrelet
 Tyto alba (western population) — barn owl

Reptiles

Extirpated reptiles

 Actinemys marmorata — Pacific pond turtle
 Crotalus horridus — timber rattlesnake
 Phrynosoma douglasii — pygmy short-horned lizard
 Pituophis catenifer catenifer — Pacific gophersnake

Endangered reptiles

 Chrysemys picta bellii (Pacific Coast population) — western painted turtle
 Clemmys guttata — spotted turtle
 Coluber constrictor foxii — blue racer
 Contia tenuis — sharp-tailed snake
 Dermochelys coriacea — leatherback seaturtle
 Emydoidea blandingii (Nova Scotia population) — Blanding's turtle
 Eumeces septentrionalis — prairie skink
 Hypsiglena torquata — nightsnake

Threatened reptiles

 Apalone spinifera — spiny softshell
 Coluber constrictor flaviventris — eastern yellow-bellied racer
 Crotalus oreganus — western rattlesnake
 Elaphe gloydi — eastern foxsnake
 Elaphe spiloides — grey ratsnake
 Emydoidea blandingii (Great Lakes / St. Lawrence population) — Blanding's turtle
 Heterodon platirhinos — eastern hog-nosed snake
 Pituophis catenifer deserticola — Great Basin gophersnake
 Regina septemvittata — queen snake
 Sistrurus catenatus — massasauga
 Sternotherus odoratus — stinkpot
 Thamnophis butleri — Butler's gartersnake
 Thamnophis sauritus (Atlantic population) — eastern ribbonsnake

Reptiles of special concern

 Charina bottae — rubber boa
 Chrysemys picta bellii (intermountain–Rocky Mountain population) — western painted turtle
 Coluber constrictor mormon — western yellow-bellied racer
 Eumeces skiltonianus — western skink
 Graptemys geographica — northern map turtle
 Lampropeltis triangulum — milksnake
 Thamnophis sauritus (Great Lakes population) — eastern ribbonsnake

Amphibians

Extirpated amphibians

 Ambystoma tigrinum (Great Lakes population) — tiger salamander

Endangered amphibians

 Acris crepitans — northern cricket frog
 Ambystoma texanum — small-mouthed salamander
 Ambystoma tigrinum (southern mountain population) — tiger salamander
 Ascaphus montanus — Rocky Mountain tailed frog
 Rana pipiens (southern mountain population) — northern leopard frog
 Rana pretiosa — Oregon spotted frog

Threatened amphibians

 Ambystoma jeffersonianum — Jefferson salamander
 Bufo fowleri — Fowler's toad
 Desmognathus ochrophaeus — Allegheny Mountain dusky salamander
 Dicamptodon tenebrosus — coastal giant salamander
 Spea intermontana — Great Basin spadefoot

Amphibians of special concern

 Ascaphus truei — coast tailed frog
 Bufo boreas — western toad
 Bufo cognatus — Great Plains toad
 Gyrinophilus porphyriticus — spring salamander
 Plethodon idahoensis — Coeur d'Alene salamander
 Rana aurora — red-legged frog
 Rana pipiens (western boreal/prairie populations) — northern leopard frog

Fish

Extirpated fish

 Erimystax x-punctatus — gravel chub
 Polyodon spathula — paddlefish

Endangered fish

 Acipenser transmontanus — white sturgeon
 Catostomus catostomus subsp. — Salish sucker
 Coregonus huntsmani — Atlantic whitefish
 Coregonus reighardi — shortnose cisco
 Gasterosteus sp. — benthic Enos Lake stickleback
 Gasterosteus sp. — benthic Paxton Lake stickleback
 Gasterosteus sp. — benthic Vananda Creek stickleback
 Gasterosteus sp. — limnetic Enos Lake stickleback
 Gasterosteus sp. — limnetic Paxton Lake stickleback
 Gasterosteus sp. — limnetic Vananda Creek stickleback
 Lampetra richardsoni var. marifuga — Morrison Creek lamprey
 Moxostoma hubbsi — copper redhorse
 Notropis anogenus — pugnose shiner
 Noturus stigmosus — northern madtom
 Rhinichthys cataractae subsp. — Nooksack dace
 Salmo salar (Inner Bay of Fundy populations) — Atlantic salmon
 Salvelinus fontinalis timagamiensis — aurora trout

Threatened fish

 Ammocrypta pellucida — eastern sand darter
 Anarhichas denticulatus — northern wolffish
 Anarhichas minor — spotted wolffish
 Cottus confusus — shorthead sculpin
 Cottus sp. — Cultus pygmy sculpin
 Cottus sp. (St. Mary and Milk River populations) — eastslope sculpin
 Erimyzon sucetta — lake chubsucker
 Hybognathus argyritis — western silvery minnow
 Lampetra macrostoma — Vancouver lamprey
 Lepisosteus oculatus — spotted gar
 Notropis percobromus — carmine shiner
 Osmerus spectrum — Lake Utopia dwarf smelt
 Percina copelandi — channel darterm

Fish of special concern

 Acipenser medirostris — green sturgeon
 Anarhichas lupus — Atlantic wolffish
 Coregonus kiyi kiyi — Upper Great Lakes kiyi
 Cottus hubbsi — Columbia sculpin
 Esox americanus vermiculatus — grass pickerel
 Fundulus diaphanus (Newfoundland population) — banded killifish
 Fundulus notatus — blackstripe topminnow
 Lepomis gulosus — warmouth
 Macrhybopsis storeriana — silver chub
 Minytrema melanops — spotted sucker
 Moxostoma carinatum — river redhorse
 Myoxocephalus thompsonii (Great Lakes–Western St. Lawrence populations) — deepwater sculpin
 Notropis bifrenatus — bridle shiner
 Opsopoeodus emiliae — pugnose minnow

Arthropods

Extirpated arthropods

 Callophrys (Incisalia) irus — frosted elfin
 Euchloe ausonides — island marble
 Plebejus melissa samuelis — Karner blue

Endangered arthropods

 Apodemia mormo (southern mountain population) — Mormon metalmark
 Bombus affinis - rusty-patched bumble bee
 Bombus bohemicus - gypsy cuckoo bumble bee
 Brychius hungerfordi - Hungerford's crawling water beetle
 Cicindela patruela - Northern Barrens tiger beetle
 Coenonympha nipisiquit — maritime ringlet
 Copablepharon fuscum — sand-verbena moth
 Erynnis persius persius — eastern Persius duskywing
 Erynnis martialis - mottled duskywing
 Euphydryas editha taylori — Taylor's checkerspot
 Gomphus ventricosus - skillet clubtail
 Hemileuca sp. - bogbean buckmoth
 Hesperia ottoe — Ottoe skipper
 Papaipema aweme — Aweme borer
 Icaricia saepiolus insulanus — island blue
 Prodoxus quinquepunctellus — five-spotted bogus yucca moth
 Satyrium semiluna — half-moon hairstreak
 Schinia avemensis — gold-edged gem
 Schinia bimatris — white flower moth
 Somatochlora hineana - Hine's emerald
 Stylurus amnicola - riverine clubtail
 Stylurus laurae - Laura's clubtail
 Stylurus olivaceus - olive clubtail
 Tegeticula corruptrix — non-pollinating yucca moth
 Tegeticula yuccasella — yucca moth

Threatened arthropods

 Apodemia mormo (prairie population) — Mormon metalmark
 Euphyes vestris (western population) — dun skipper
 Hesperia dacotae — Dakota skipper
 Oarisma poweshiek — Poweshiek skipperling
 Satyrium behrii columbia — Behr's hairstreak, columbia subspecies

Arthropods of special concern

 Danaus plexippus — monarch
 Limenitis weidemeyerii — Weidemeyer's admiral
 Polites sonora — Sonora skipper

Molluscs

Extirpated molluscs

 Alasmidonta heterodon — dwarf wedgemussel
 Cryptomastix devia — Puget Oregonian snail

Endangered molluscs

 Allogona townsendiana — Oregon forestsnail
 Epioblasma torulosa rangiana — northern riffleshell
 Epioblasma triquetra — snuffbox
 Haliotis kamtschatkana — northern abalone
 Lampsilis fasciola — wavy-rayed lampmussel
 Obovaria subrotunda — round hickorynut
 Physella johnsoni — Banff Springs snail
 Physella wrighti — hotwater physa
 Pleurobema sintoxia — round pigtoe
 Prophysaon coelureum — blue-grey taildropper slug
 Ptychobranchus fasciolaris — kidneyshell
 Simpsonaias ambigua — mudpuppy mussel
 Villosa fabalis — rayed bean

Threatened molluscs

 Hemphillia dromedarius — dromedary jumping-slug

Molluscs of special concern

 Gonidea angulata — Rocky Mountain ridged mussel
 Lampsilis cariosa — yellow lampmussel
 Nearctula sp. — threaded vertigo
 Ostrea conchaphila — Olympia oyster

Vascular plants

Extirpated vascular plants

 Collinsia verna — spring blue-eyed mary
 Desmodium illinoense — Illinois tick-trefoil

Endangered vascular plants

 Abronia umbellata — pink sand-verbena
 Actaea elata — tall bugbane
 Adiantum capillus-veneris — southern maidenhair fern
 Agalinis aspera — rough agalinis
 Agalinis gattingeri — Gattinger's agalinis
 Agalinis skinneriana — Skinner's agalinis
 Ammannia robusta — scarlet ammannia
 Antennaria flagellaris — stoloniferous pussytoes
 Aristida basiramea — forked three-awned grass
 balsamorhiza deltoidea — deltoid balsamroot
 Betula lenta — cherry birch
 Braya longii — Long's braya
 Buchnera americana — bluehearts
 Camissonia contorta — contorted-pod evening-primrose
 Carex lupuliformis — false hop sedge
 Carex juniperorum — juniper sedge
 Castanea dentata — American chestnut
 Castilleja levisecta — golden paintbrush
 Chimaphila maculata — spotted wintergreen
 Cirsium pitcheri — Pitcher's thistle
 Collomia tenella — slender collomia
 Coreopsis rosea — pink coreopsis
 Cryptantha minima — tiny cryptanthe
 Cypripedium candidum — small white lady's-slipper
 Drosera filiformis — thread-leaved sundew
 Eleocharis equisetoides — horsetail spike-rush
 Epilobium densiflorum — dense spike-primrose
 Epilobium torreyi — brook spike-primrose
 Frasera caroliniensis — American columbo
 Gentiana alba — white prairie gentian
 Geum peckii — eastern mountain avens
 Isoetes engelmannii — Engelmann's quillwort
 Isotria medeoloides — small whorled pogonia
 Isotria verticillata — large whorled pogonia
 Juglans cinerea — butternut
 Juncus kelloggii — Kellogg's rush
 Lespedeza virginica — slender bush-clover
 Liparis liliifolia — purple twayblade
 Lipocarpha micrantha — small-flowered lipocarpha
 Lotus formosissimus — seaside bird's-foot lotus
 Lotus pinnatus — bog bird's-foot trefoil
 Lupinus densiflorus — dense-flowered lupine
 Lupinus lepidus var. lepidus — prairie lupine
 Lupinus rivularis — streambank lupine
 Magnolia acuminata — cucumber tree
 Meconella oregana — white meconella
 Microseris bigelovii — coast microseris
 Minuartia pusilla — dwarf sandwort
 Morus rubra — red mulberry
 Opuntia humifusa — eastern prickly pear cactus
 Orthocarpus barbatus — Grand Coulee owl-clover
 Orthocarpus bracteosus — rosy owl-clover
 Panax quinquefolius — American ginseng
 Pedicularis furbishiae — Furbish's lousewort
 Phacelia ramosissima — branched phacelia
 Plantago cordata — heart-leaved plantain
 Platanthera leucophaea — eastern prairie fringed-orchid
 Platanthera praeclara — western prairie fringed-orchid
 Polygala incarnata — pink milkwort
 Psilocarphus brevissimus (southern mountain population) — dwarf woolly-heads
 Psilocarphus elatior — tall woolly-heads
 Pycnanthemum incanum — hoary mountain-mint
 Ranunculus alismifolius var. alismifolius — water-plantain buttercup
 Rotala ramosior — toothcup
 Salix jejuna — barrens willow
 Sanicula arctopoides — bear's-foot sanicle
 Silene scouleri grandis — coastal Scouler's catchfly
 Silene spaldingii — Spalding's campion
 Solidago speciosa — showy goldenrod
 Stylophorum diphyllum — wood-poppy
 Symphyotrichum frondosum — short-rayed alkali aster
 Tephrosia virginiana — Virginia goat's-rue
 Tonella tenella — small-flowered tonella
 Trichophorum planifolium — bashful bulrush
 Trillium flexipes — drooping trillium
 Triphora trianthophora — nodding pogonia
 Triphysaria versicolor versicolor — bearded owl-clover
 Tripterocalyx micranthus — small-flowered sand-verbena
 Triteleia howellii — Howell's triteleia
 Viola pedata — bird's-foot violet
 Woodsia obtusa — blunt-lobed woodsia

Threatened vascular plants

 Aletris farinosa — colicroot
 Azolla mexicana — Mexican mosquito-fern
 Bartonia paniculata paniculata — branched bartonia
 Braya fernaldii — Fernald's braya
 Buchloe dactyloides — buffalograss
 Calochortus lyallii — Lyall's mariposa lily
 Camassia scilloides — wild hyacinth
 Carex sabulosa — Baikal sedge
 Castilleja rupicola — cliff paintbrush
 Celtis tenuifolia — dwarf hackberry
 Cephalanthera austiniae — phantom orchid
 Chenopodium subglabrum — smooth goosefoot
 Cirsium hillii — Hill's thistle
 Corydalis scouleri — Scouler's corydalis
 Dalea villosa var. villosa — hairy prairie-clover
 Eleocharis tuberculosa — tubercled spike-rush
 Enemion biternatum — false rue-anemone
 Eurybia divaricata — white wood aster
 Gentianopsis virgata subsp. victorinii — Victorin's gentian
 Gymnocladus dioicus — Kentucky coffee-tree
 Halimolobos virgata — slender mouse-ear-cress
 Hydrastis canadensis — goldenseal
 Hydrocotyle umbellata — water-pennywort
 Hymenoxys herbacea — lakeside daisy
 Iris lacustris — dwarf lake iris
 Iris missouriensis — western blue flag
 Isoetes bolanderi — Bolander's quillwort
 Justicia americana — American water-willow
 Lachananthes caroliniana — redroot
 Liatris spicata — dense blazing star
 Limnanthes macounii — Macoun's meadowfoam
 Lophiola aurea — golden crest
 Phlox speciosa subsp. occidentalis — showy phlox
 Polemonium vanbruntiae — van Brunt's Jacob's-ladder
 Polystichum lemmonii — Lemmon's holly fern
 Polystichum scopulinum — mountain holly fern
 Ptelea trifoliata — common hoptree
 Sabatia kennedyana — Plymouth gentian
 Salix chlorolepis — green-scaled willow
 Sanicula bipinnatifida — purple sanicle
 Sericocarpus rigidus — white-top aster
 Smilax rotundifolia (Great Lakes plains population) — round-leaved greenbrier
 Symphyotrichum anticostense — Anticosti aster
 Symphyotrichum laurentianum — Gulf of St. Lawrence aster
 Symphyotrichum praealtum — willowleaf aster
 Symphyotrichum prenanthoides — crooked-stem aster
 Symphyotrichum sericeum — western silvery aster
 Tradescantia occidentalis — western spiderwort
 Vaccinium stamineum — deerberry
 Viola praemorsa subsp. praemorsa — yellow montane violet, praemorsa subspecies
 Yucca glauca — soapweed

Vascular plants of special concern

 Achillea millefolium var. megacephalum — large-headed woolly yarrow
 Armeria maritima subsp. interior — Athabasca thrift
 Arnoglossum plantagineum — tuberous Indian-plantain
 Asplenium scolopendrium var. americanum — American hart's-tongue fern
 Astragalus robbinsii var. fernaldii — Fernald's milk-vetch
 Bidens amplissima — Vancouver Island beggarticks
 Cicuta maculata var. victorinii — Victorin's water-hemlock
 Clethra alnifolia — sweet pepperbush
 Deschampsia mackenzieana — Mackenzie hairgrass
 Dryopteris arguta — coastal wood fern
 Fraxinus quadrangulata — blue ash
 Hibiscus moscheutos — swamp rose-mallow
 Isoetes prototypus — prototype quillwort
 Juncus caesariensis — New Jersey rush
 Lilaeopsis chinensis — eastern lilaeopsis
 Potamogeton hillii — Hill's pondweed
 Psilocarphus brevissimus (prairie population) — dwarf woolly-heads
 Psilocarphus elatior (prairie population) — tall woolly-heads
 Rosa setigera — climbing prairie rose
 Salix brachycarpa var. psammophila — sand dune short-capsuled willow
 Salix silicicola — felt-leaf willow
 Salix turnorii — Turnor's willow
 Solidago houghtonii — Houghton's goldenrod
 Solidago riddellii — Riddell's goldenrod
 Tanacetum huronense var. floccosum — floccose tansy

Mosses

Extirpated mosses

 Ptychomitrium incurvum — incurved grizzled moss

Endangered mosses

 Bartramia stricta — rigid apple moss
 Bryoandersonia illecebra — spoon-leaved moss
 Entosthodon rubiginosus — rusty cord-moss
 Fabronia pusilla — silver hair moss
 Fissidens pauperculus — poor pocket moss
 Scouleria marginata — margined streamside moss

Threatened mosses

 Bartramia halleriana — Haller's apple moss
 Pterygoneurum kozlovii — alkaline wing-nerved moss

Mosses of special concern

 Bryoerythrophyllum columbianum — Columbian carpet moss
 Entosthodon fascicularis — banded cord-moss
 Fissidens exilis — pygmy pocket moss
 Syntrichia laevipila — twisted oak moss

Lichens

Endangered lichens

 Erioderma pedicellatum (Atlantic population) — boreal felt lichen
 Heterodermia sitchensis — seaside centipede lichen

Threatened lichens

 Leptogium rivulare — flooded jellyskin

Lichens of special concern

 Erioderma pedicellatum (boreal population) — boreal felt lichen
 Nephroma occultum — cryptic paw
 Sclerophora peronella (Nova Scotia population) — frosted glass-whiskers

References
 5. Amtyaz Safi, Hashmi MUA and Smith JP. 2020. A review of distribution, threats, conservation and status of freshwater turtles of Ontario, Canada. Journal of Environmental sciences. 2(1) (2020): 36-41.

External links
 Species at Risk in Canada Registry
 List of Species at Risk in Canada, by category
Species at Risk in Canada at Hinterland Who's Who

Nature conservation in Canada
Wildlife conservation in Canada
Wildlife